El Corazón (English: The Heart) is the seventh album by American singer-songwriter Steve Earle, released in 1997 (see 1997 in music). The music writers of The Associated Press voted it one of the ten best pop albums of the 1990s.

Track listing 

All songs written by Steve Earle.

"Christmas in Washington" – 4:58
"Taneytown" – 5:13
With Emmylou Harris on background vocals.
"If You Fall" – 4:10
"I Still Carry You Around" – 2:45
With the Del McCoury Band.
"Telephone Road" – 3:42
With The Fairfield Four on background vocals.
"Somewhere Out There" – 3:46
"You Know the Rest" – 2:12
"N.Y.C." – 3:37
With the Supersuckers.
"Poison Lovers" – 3:47
Duet with Siobhan Kennedy.
"The Other Side of Town" – 4:17
"Here I Am" – 2:38
"Fort Worth Blues" – 4:02

Personnel
Steve Earle - guitar, vocals, mandola, harmonium, harmonica
Del McCoury - guitar, vocals
Emmylou Harris - vocals
Ray Kennedy - drums, harmonium
Dan Bolton - guitar
Mike Bub - bass
Tommy Hannum - steel guitar
Roy Huskey, Jr. - bass
Kelly Looney - bass
Robbie McCoury - banjo
Ronnie McCoury - mandolin, vocals
Micheal Smotherman - organ
Dan "Dancing Eagle" Seigal - drums
Eddie Spaghetti - bass
Ross Rice - drums, vocals
David Steele - guitar
Brad Jones - bass
Renaldo Allegre - guitar
Brian Blade, Jr. - drums, percussion, washboard
Jason Carter - fiddle
Mark Stuart - acoustic guitar, mandolin
Justin Earle - electric guitar
Jim Hoke - baritone saxophone
 Tony Fitzpatrick - Album Artwork

References

External links 
A.V. Club review, Mar 29, 2002

1997 albums
Steve Earle albums
Warner Music Group albums